The Dovers were an American garage rock band of the mid-1960s. The Dovers were an example of mid-1960s folk rock, psychedelic rock and pop, heavily influenced by the British Invasion and American groups such as The Byrds.

Career
The Dovers were from Santa Barbara, California, and started their band under the name The Vandells. They began their recording career as The Dovers in 1965 with the Miramar Records release "She's Gone"/"What Am I Going To Do?," which reportedly was a minor hit in the Santa Barbara–Ventura County area. Three singles followed in late 1965 and early 1966, showing The Dovers' interest in folk and pop; none of their four singles met with national success, and The Dovers broke up shortly afterward.

The group recorded a total of four singles for Miramar:

 "She's Gone" / "What Am I Going To Do?" (Miramar 118, September 1965);
 "I Could Be Happy" / "People Ask Me Why" (Miramar 121, November 1965, also released as Reprise 0439, December 1965);
 "The Third Eye" / "Your Love" (Miramar 123, April 1966)
 "She's Not Just Anybody" / "About Me" (Miramar 124, May 1966)

A Top 40 list from radio station KIST in Santa Barbara from May 28, 1966, shows The Dovers' single "The Third Eye" listed as one of the station's "Hit Bound Sounds" of the week.

Reissues
The Dovers went largely unnoticed by music collectors until garage rock compilation albums were released in the late 1970s and early 1980s. A cult following developed around the group, who became known among collectors for their catchy songs and wistful vocals. "What Am I Going To Do" is available on Rhino Records' Nuggets box set. "She's Gone" is given on Pebbles, Volume 2, while "She's Not Just Anybody" is available on Pebbles 8, Southern California 1. The group's original bass player, Laudewig, died in the 1980s.

In 2003, Misty Lane issued a 10" vinyl retrospective album that includes all 8 songs by the Dovers, called We're Not Just Anybody.

The 2009 song "Walkabout" by Atlas Sound heavily samples the track "What Am I Going To Do." The track is a collaboration with Animal Collective's Panda Bear.

Band members
The Dovers were:

 Bruce Clawson (guitar)
 Tim Granada (guitar, vocals)
 Robbie Laudewig (bass)
 Rick Morinini (drums, singles 1–2)
 Randy Busby (drums, singles 3–4)
 Tony Rivas (saxophone, tambourine, backing vocals)
 Nick Hoffman (guitar, replaced Clawson)

Literature
In 2007 Jawbone Press published Riot on the Sunset Strip: Rock 'n' Roll's Last Stand in Hollywood by Domenic Priore. The book featured a few pages on the history of The Dovers, including a rare interview with Tim Granada.

References

External links
A brief history and interview with Rick Morinini and Bruce Clawson

Garage rock groups from California
Musical groups established in 1965